Frank Wood (born May 6, 1960) is an American actor who has appeared in various television, film, and theatre roles.

Early life and education
Wood is the son of Margaret (Byers) and Robert Coldwell Wood, a political scientist who briefly served as United States secretary of housing and urban development in the Lyndon Johnson administration. His sister is U.S. senator and former governor of New Hampshire, Maggie Hassan. Wood attended the Buxton School. He earned a Bachelor of Arts degree from Wesleyan University in 1984 and a MFA from the New York University Tisch School of the Arts.

Career
Wood won a Tony Award in 1999 for Best Featured Actor in a Play for Side Man. He played Bill in August: Osage County on Broadway. From September 14, 2010, to March 27, 2011, Wood starred as the character Roy Cohn in the acclaimed off-Broadway revival of Tony Kushner’s Pulitzer Prize-winning play Angels in America staged by the Signature Theatre Company in Manhattan. Wood played Gary Lucas in Greetings from Tim Buckley, a film on Tim and Jeff Buckley, which premiered at the 2012 Toronto International Film Festival.

In 2016, Wood played the Night Clerk in Eugene O'Neill's play Hughie opposite Forest Whitaker's Broadway debut at the Booth Theatre in New York City, directed by Michael Grandage.

Wood is on the faculty of HB Studio in New York City.

Filmography

Film

Television

References

External links

1960 births
Living people
American male film actors
American male television actors
American male stage actors
Place of birth missing (living people)
Wesleyan University alumni
Tisch School of the Arts alumni
20th-century American male actors
21st-century American male actors
Buxton School (Massachusetts) alumni